Triggered may refer to:

 Triggered (book), a 2019 non-fiction book by Donald Trump Jr.
 Triggered (film), a 2020 South African action-horror film
 "Triggered (Freestyle)", a song by American singer Jhené Aiko
 Remotely triggered earthquakes

See also 
 Trigger (disambiguation)